Powerex Corp. v. Reliant Energy Services Inc., 551 U.S. 224 (2007), was a United States Supreme Court case about federal court jurisdiction and foreign sovereigns which involved BC Hydro's Powerex under the Foreign Sovereign Immunities Act of 1976 (FSIA).

External links
 

2007 in United States case law
United States Supreme Court cases
United States Supreme Court cases of the Roberts Court
NRG Energy
BC Hydro
United States foreign sovereign immunity case law